Emmanuel Glaser (born 31 May 1964) is a French Lawyer, and juriste, specialised in Public law.

After two year of Khâgne at Lycée Henri-IV in Paris, he was admitted at the 'École normale supérieure in 1983, getting a master's degree in history. He studied at Sciences Po Paris in the Public service section. In 1992, he joined the École nationale d'administration opting for the Conseil d'État. He holds a diploma from the INALCO where he studied Arabic from 1986 to 1988. He was admitted to the barreau de Paris in 2011.

References 

Members of the Conseil d'État (France)
Sciences Po alumni
École nationale d'administration alumni
École Normale Supérieure alumni
21st-century French lawyers
1964 births
Living people